The Royal Borough of Windsor and Maidenhead is a Royal Borough of Berkshire, in South East England. It is named after both the towns of Maidenhead and Windsor, the borough also covers the nearby towns of Ascot and Eton. It is home to Windsor Castle, Eton College, Legoland Windsor and Ascot Racecourse. It is one of four boroughs entitled to be prefixed Royal and is one of six unitary authorities in the county, which has historic and ceremonial status.

Incorporation and enhancement to unitary authority
The borough was formed on 1 April 1974 as one of six standard districts or boroughs within Berkshire, under the Local Government Act 1972, from minor parts of Berkshire and Buckinghamshire which remained for more than two decades Administrative Counties, and such that Berkshire assumed the high-level local government functions for the resultant area.  The change merged the boroughs of Maidenhead and Windsor (formally the Royal Borough of New Windsor), the rural districts of Cookham and Windsor, and in Buckinghamshire, north of the River Thames (on the left bank): Eton urban district and the parishes of Datchet, Horton and Wraysbury in its rural district. The area immediately inherited by law royal borough status from the town of Windsor which contains Windsor Castle.

The local authority is its Council. Its area became a unitary authority area on 1 April 1998 with virtually full local government powers as Berkshire County Council was abolished. A minority of the area in terms of population has a lower level of local government, the civil parish.

River Thames 
The borough straddles the River Thames. Approximately half of its flow through the borough has a bypass and seasonally-variable flood relief channel, the Jubilee River. Further flood relief channels are planned for the reaches below the Borough to benefit many other settlements including Datchet and Wraysbury in the borough which were the settlements most widely affected by the UK storms of January-February 2014.

Towns and villages 

The Royal Borough of Windsor and Maidenhead contains the following towns and villages:

Politics

Westminster
The Royal Borough is represented at Westminster by two members of parliament of the Conservative Party: Adam Afriyie (for Windsor) and Theresa May (for Maidenhead).  Maidenhead has been held by the Conservative Party since its creation in 1997. Windsor has been held by the same party since 1874 with varying representation from its 1484 creation including more than 350 initial years with two MPs. Small parts of wards of other seats, notably the Slough unitary area and Wokingham have intermittently been included in each seat to prevent malapportionment which is a definition of boundaries which causes any MP to serve a significantly different number of potential voters (electors) than the others.

The irregular, elongated shape of the Windsor seat being the south-east half of the Borough has been criticised by academics who noted the net changes which the Heath administration led through Parliament in 1972, implemented in 1974, intensified difference. They frequently grouped right-leaning suburban areas within urban historic centres and more modern, urban left-leaning areas such as the bulk of Slough. This ostensibly amounted to nationwide gerrymandering or homogenisation to install a greater number safe seats at the expense of marginal seats however also reflected the majority of social associations of people in each area.

Local government

Elections for councillors to the Royal Borough take place every four years; the last took place in 2019. The local authority is controlled a cabinet. The Royal Borough is currently under a Conservative administration, with Cllr Andrew Johnson the leader of the council.

The borough's Mayor is Cllr John Story, and Mayor's Consort Barbara Story.

41 councillors represent the electorate of 19 wards. The political control of the Royal Borough is as follows:

Parish and town councils
There are 14 parish councils and 1 town council in the borough:

The towns of Maidenhead and Windsor are unparished.

Education 

The Windsor and Maidenhead LEA provides a comprehensive system, with a three-tier successive school system in Windsor, and two-tier education elsewhere. Colleges and sixth forms are available in the main two towns as well as across its borders in Egham, Slough and Wokingham.

Freedom of the Borough
The following people and military units have received the Freedom of the Borough of Windsor and Maidenhead.

Individuals
 Princess Elizabeth, Duchess of Edinburgh: 1947.
 Prince of Wales : 1970. 
 Queen Elizabeth The Queen Mother: 1980.
 Prince Philip, Duke of Edinburgh  : 1995.
 Thomas Bailey: 1974.
 Stanley Platt : 1974.
 Sir John Smith : 1975.
 James Matthews: 1988.
 Peter Gray : 1994.
 Geoffrey Blacker : 1996.
 Sir Nicholas Winton : 1999.
 Harry Parker: 1999.
 Sir Clive Woodward : 2003.
 David Lunn : 2008.
 David Oram : 2012.

Military Units
 The Royal Berkshire Regiment: 1959.
 The Duke of Edinburgh's Royal Regiment: 1960.
 The Household Cavalry: 1965.
 The Brigade of Guards: 1968.
 The Berkshire Yeomanry: 1993.
 The Royal Gloucestershire, Berkshire and Wiltshire Regiment: 1999.
 The Rifles: 2006.

Twin towns 
The Royal Borough of Windsor and Maidenhead is twinned with the following Towns:
 Neuilly-sur-Seine, France – established 1955 with Royal Borough of New Windsor.
 Saint-Cloud, France – established 1957 with Maidenhead.
 Bad Godesberg, Germany – established 1960 with Maidenhead.
 Goslar, Germany – established 1969 with Royal Borough of New Windsor.
 Frascati, Italy – established 1972 with Maidenhead.
 Kortrijk, Belgium – established 1981 with Royal Borough of Windsor and Maidenhead.

References

 
1974 establishments in England
Unitary authority districts of England
Districts of Berkshire
Local authorities adjoining the River Thames
Places with royal patronage in England
Boroughs in England